The second Atlantic League was a Class D minor league baseball league that operated for one season in 1914. The league had been known as the New York–New Jersey League a season earlier. The league president was Rosslyn M. Cox, who would later serve as the mayor of Middletown, New York.

The Poughkeepsie Honey Bugs finished first in the league standings, with a record of 65–31 (there was no postseason). Internal politics and poor financial agreements hindered the league, which made it to the year's end, but folded before it could play another season. It was unrelated, except for name, to the first league with the name. The name has subsequently been used for a contemporary independent minor league.

Teams

Source: 

 The Bloomfield–Long Branch Cubans finished the season as the Asbury Park Sea Urchins, located in Asbury Park, New Jersey
 The Newark Cubans finished the season as the Long Branch Cubans, located in Long Branch, New Jersey

Final standings
Each team was scheduled to play a 100-game season, however all teams played fewer games, due to weather cancellations or the overall condition of the league. The season started on May 20 and ended on September 7.

 Newark was 26–11 when they relocated to Long Branch
 Bloomfield–Long Branch was 15–22 when they relocated to Asbury Park

Source:

Notable players

Notable players in the Atlantic League's only season of 1914 include:

José Acosta
Ángel Aragón
Desmond Beatty
Dennis Berran
Andy Coakley
John Ganzel
Sam Hope
John Kull
George Lowe
Charlie Meara
Ricardo Torres

References

Baseball leagues in Connecticut
Baseball leagues in New Jersey
Baseball leagues in New York (state)
Defunct minor baseball leagues in the United States
Sports leagues established in 1914
1915 disestablishments in the United States